Whitecorn is an unincorporated community in St. Charles County, in the U.S. state of Missouri.

The community most likely was so named on account of the local white corn crop.

References

Unincorporated communities in St. Charles County, Missouri
Unincorporated communities in Missouri